Madiraju Ranga Rao (born 1935) is a scholar of Telugu Literature, associated with Classical Literature, Indian Poetics, Modern Poetry, Novel & Criticism and Studies in Sanskrit Literature.

Education 
Madiraju Ranga Rao  was a student of Telugu Literature with qualifications in M.A. Telugu (Osmania University 1962), Ph.D (Osmania University 1966)and M.A. Sanskrit (Osmania University 1969). His Doctoral Thesis is "Concept and Practice of Poetry of Kavitrayamu".

Career 
Madiraju Ranga Rao is one of the foremost literary writers in Modern Telugu Poetry.

Professor Madiraju Ranga Rao taught Telugu and Sanskrit Literature at Kakatiya University (1968–95) and Osmania University (1964–68), Andhra Pradesh, India. During his tenure, he has undertaken research supervision of 12 M. Phil and 10 Ph. D. research scholars.

He was a member of Editorial Committee of Critical Edition of Andhra Maha Bhagavatham (Chief Editor, Acharya Raya Prolu Subba Rao) and Member of the Editorial Board of Critical Edition of Andhra Maha Bharathamu sponsored by the UGC (Chief Editor, Acharya Khandavalli Laxmi Ranjanam).

Ranga Rao has been the Principal Investigator of two major research projects of University Grants Commission (UGC), New Delhi. The two projects are "Concept of Democracy and National Integration in Free-Verse" and "National, International and Human Facets in Post-Independence Telugu Free-Verse". During 2004–06, he was also Senior Fellow, Department of Culture, Government of India

Ranga Rao's research interests include Classical Literature, Indian Poetics, Modern Poetry, Novel and Criticism & Studies in Sanskrit Literature. He has made a significant contribution in the field of Modern Telugu Poetry and Research & Literary Criticism. Ranga Rao's prominence in Telugu Literature came with his distinctive poetry "Sveccha Kavithvam".

Since 1952, Ranga Rao has been writing extensively in various journals including Swatantra, Navatha, Bharathi, Sravanthi, Jayanthi, Vangmayi, Musi, Andhra Prabha, Andhra Bhoomi etc. He published close to 46 books on Sveccha Kavithvam and 14 books on Research & Literary Criticism.

Ranga Rao won the Best Teacher award in 1992 for teaching and research studies. In the year 1993, he won the Best Modern Poetry award from Telugu University, Hyderabad.

Ranga Rao is the founder and editor of Rasadhuni Sahithi Parishat since 1970

Publications
A. Research & Literary Criticism
 Kavithrayam-Srujana Kala Shilpam
 Sveccha Kavithvam
 Navala Swaroopam
 Parishodhana Svaroopam
 Adhikara Bhasha
 Anuvada Kala
 Sri Sri Maha Prasthanam
 Dasarathi Punarnanam
 Sama Darshini
 Alokanam Literary Essays
 Srujana Drushti-Manaveeya Bhavana
 Sahitya Vyasalu
 Facets of Telugu Free-Verse
 Srujana Chetana-Kalpavruksham

B. Poetry: Sveccha Kavithvam
 Maananaveeyam
 Padagettina Udayam
 Mukta Dhatri
 Idi Vietnam
 Manobhoomikalo
 Jeevana Rekhala
 Mukthakalu
 Avaahanam
 Nalo Pravahistondi Nadi
 Naku Jnapakamundi
 Manobhoomikalo
 Velugulo Ee Nelapi
 Melkonna Ee Samayam
 Shabdamai Pranamai
 Agnimayam Jeevitham
 Kalanni Nilipi Kshanam
 Ee Thram Svara Chitram
 Ashanthi Orchestra
 Varthamanam Screen Pai
 Agninundi Anandaniki
 Jail Corner Nundi
 Payanam Nundi Anandanki
 Diary Darpanamlo
 Ee Shatabdi Rekkalapai
 Shanti Svapnam
 Cross Fire
 Cease Fire
 Nedu Repu Madhya
 Kirana Padham
 Abhishekam
 Agamanam
 Eppatiki Kothe
 Srujana Darshanam
 Maro-vaipu
 Hrudaya Megham
 Samakaleenam
 Abhinava Yanam
 Antharanga Dhvani
 Navarambham
 Navadarshanam
 Gift- Packet
 Punardarshanam
 Nadiche Velugu Chuttu
 Apoorva
 Ajnatham Nundi
 Roju Vasthnudi Svacchanga

References

External links 
 rasadhuni.com
 openlibrary.org
 culturopedia.com
 museumstuff.com

1935 births
Living people
20th-century Indian poets
Poets from Andhra Pradesh
Telugu poets